Cai Chengyu (born January 17, 1998) is a Chinese operatic tenor. He is known for participating in Hunan TV's singing variety show Super-Vocal where he first gained attention and recognition throughout China for singing 9 high-quality High Cs in his debut and finally made to the top 6 leading singers. In 2019, Cai joined Decca Records together with Tong Zhuo, Gao Tianhe and Ju Hongchuan as China's first male bel canto quartet named Super Vocal. In the same year, Cai was recognized as the Forbes China 30 Under 30 List honoree.

Early life 
Cai grew up in Suzhou, Anhui, China and attended Sucheng No.1 High School. In his last music class in high school, he performed "Heroes' Song" at classmates' invitation. Impressed by Cai's talent, his music teacher encouraged him to pursue a career in music. A year later, he successfully made to Shanghai Conservatory of Music with the fourth best grades nationwide. Cai is currently studying under the celebrated baritone Wang Kaiwei.

Singing career 
In 2018, Cai participated in Hunan TV singing competition Super-Vocal. He made his debut by performing "Ah! mes amis.", one of the well-known arias from the opera "La fille du régiment". Cai smoothly knocked off a string of nine high Cs in this joyous aria “Ah! mes amis." and won the nickname of "Cai High C". Later in the competition, he has been continuously improving and finally made to the top 6 leading singers in Super-Vocal for the year of 2018.

In February 2019, he was invited to participate in Hunan TV singing competition Singer together with other finalists from Super-Vocal (Ju Hongchuan (鞠红川), Zheng Yunlong (郑云龙) and Ayanga (阿云嘎)). After ten rounds of challenge, on April 12, 2019, the team achieved the third place in the Grand Final.

In the same year, to commemorate the spirit of May Fourth Movement and to celebrate the founding of the Communist Party, he partnered with the journalist from Xinhua News Agency, Lu Binqi, and introduced two songs "Journey" and "Original Aspiration"() .
 
In June 2019, being part of the "Revival of the Classics Project" organized by NetEase Cloud Music (网易云音乐), Cai released his first single by covering the song "That's it" from the rock duo Power Station.

In November 2019, after Cai teamed up with other three vocalists, the new bel canto ensemble Super Vocal announced its first single: Mandarin version of the song "Into the Unknown" (未知的真相) from the Disney animation Frozen II.

In the same month, on the 25th Anniversary of Riverdance, the well-known theatrical show consisting of traditional Irish music and dance, Cai released a Mandarin version of the show’s principle song "Lift The Wings", composed by Bill Whelan. Celebrated around the world for its Grammy-Award winning score, this release is a powerful and stirring reinterpretation of Bill Whelan’s mesmerizing soundtrack.

Performance

Super-Vocal 声入人心

Singer 2019 歌手

Other

2018 

 Hunan TV New Year's Gala

2019 

 Hunan TV Overseas Chinese New Year's Gala
 Yangtze River & Twelve Provinces/Regions New Year's Gala
 Chinese Literary and Art Circles New Year's Gala
 CCTV 2019 Lantern Festival Gala (中央广播电视总台2019元宵晚会)
 Hunan TV Space Day of China Gala
 Hunan TV 100th Anniversary of May Fourth Movement Gala
 CCTV Children's Day Gala
CCTV Qi Xi festival/Chinese Valentine's Day Gala (央视天下有情人2019七夕晚会)
2019 FIBA Men's Basketball World Cup Opening Ceremony
Hunan TV Mid-Autumn Festival Gala
National Day Concert
Chinese Folk Song National Day Gala
"70th Anniversary - My Favorite Hunan Folk Songs" Concert (唱响70年·我喜爱的湖南金曲专场音乐会)
"Ode to the Motherland · One Song One City" Concert
Silk Road International Film Festival
"Memory · Nostalgia" Guangzhou Liao Changyong Concert (“记忆·乡愁”廖昌永广州音乐会)

2020 

 Hunan TV New Year's Gala (湖南卫视跨年演唱会)

Filmography

Music Video

Variety Show

References 

1998 births
Living people
Chinese operatic tenors
21st-century Chinese male opera singers
People from Suzhou, Anhui
Singers from Anhui
Shanghai Conservatory of Music alumni